The 1976–77 season was Clydebank's eleventh season after being elected to the Scottish Football League. They competed in Scottish League Division One where they finished 2nd behind St Mirren and entering promotion to the Premier League at the first attempt. They also competed in the Scottish League Cup, Scottish Cup and Anglo-Scottish Cup.

Results

Division 1

Final League table

Scottish League Cup

Group 8

Group 8 Final Table

Knockout stage

Scottish Cup

Anglo-Scottish Cup

References

 

Clydebank
Clydebank F.C. (1965) seasons